The 2000–01 Iraqi Elite League was the 27th season of the competition since its foundation in 1974. The name of the league was changed from Iraqi First Division to Iraqi Elite League. Instead of relegating teams from the 1999–2000 season and promoting teams from the lower division in order to decide which teams were playing in the competition, the Iraq Football Association decided that every eligible team in the country from every division should play qualifying games in order to decide who participated.

The qualifying rounds saw a total of 135 teams being split into regional groups, all competing for the 16 places in the league. After all the qualifiers were over in December, the league competition itself was held with each team playing 30 matches. In the end, Al-Zawraa won their third league title in a row, finishing eight points clear at the top.

Regional qualifiers

First round
In the first qualifying round, each province apart from Baghdad and Sulaymaniya had its own qualifying tournament with the winner advancing to the second qualifying round.

Second round
In the second qualifying round, which started in September and ended in December, the remaining teams were split into five regional groups. The two Baghdad groups were played in a single round-robin format (teams played each other once) while the other three groups were played in a double round-robin format (teams played each other twice).

North Group

Central Group

South Group

Baghdad Group 1

Results

Baghdad Group 2

Results

Play-off round
In the play-off round, the two fourth-placed teams from the Baghdad Groups faced off in a two-legged tie to determine the seventh qualifying team from Baghdad.

2–2 on aggregate. Al-Difaa Al-Jawi won on away goals and qualified for the Elite League.

League table

Results

Season statistics

Top scorers

Hat-tricks

Notes
4 Player scored 4 goals
5 Player scored 5 goals

References

External links
 Iraq Football Association

Iraqi Premier League seasons
1
Iraq